ABC Air Hungary Ltd. was a cargo airline based at Budapest, Hungary. Its head office was located in Terminal 1 of Budapest Ferenc Liszt International Airport. Founded in 1998, the company operated daily cargo flights with LET-410-UVP-E, SAAB 340A, ATR-42, Airbus 300 and Boeing 737-300. The aircraft fleet consisted of three Let L-410 Turbolet in May 2010. It had also two SAAB 340A cargo variants. 2001 – the first long-term contract with DHL. 2003 – extension of the business with  operation for TNT and UPS. Cargo charter flights for the biggest courier companies – DHL, UPS, FEDEX and TNT, based on direct contracts, or in co-operation with Bridges Worldwide.ABC operated also ad-hock charter flights.
The airline is under reorganisation and planning to restart regular operations Q2/Q3 2017 using regional, narrow and wide body aircraft.

Fleet 
The fleet of ABC Air Hungary consisted of the following aircraft (November 2014):

References 

Ceased operations on November 20, 2015.

Defunct airlines of Hungary
Airlines established in 1998
Airlines disestablished in 2015
Defunct charter airlines